Dale "Smithy" Smith is  a fictional character from the British television police procedural The Bill, played by Alex Walkinshaw.  He first appeared in the fifteenth series episode "Cowardice", broadcast on 20 July 1999. Dale was introduced as a police constable, before later being promoted to sergeant and inspector.

Casting
Before joining the regular cast, Walkinshaw made three guest appearances in The Bill in 1992, 1993 and 1995. Four years later, while he was acting in a stage production at the Royal Court Theatre, one of The Bill'''s producers asked Walkinshaw to audition for the role of PC Dale "Smithy" Smith. Walkinshaw left the show in 2001, along with five other actors as part of a "cast clear-out". He returned in 2003, as Smithy was promoted to Sergeant.The Bill'' was cancelled by ITV in March 2010 due to declining ratings. Of his final days on set, Walkinshaw stated "It was emotional shooting the final scenes, although there was a lot of good humour still going around. As each week passed, more and more people left and the building got quieter. It was tough, but the sense of humour on the set was still alive and kicking right through to the very last." Walkinshaw made his last appearance as Smithy in the show's finale episode "Respect", broadcast on 31 August 2010.

Character history
Smith first arrives at Sun Hill police station as a police constable (PC), having served with the Queen's Royal Fusiliers. He later leaves Sun Hill to take up a position in the Specialist Firearms Command (then known as SO19), but returns two years later as a sergeant. In 2009 he is promoted to inspector after Rachel Weston takes up a position with Superintendent John Heaton's People Trafficking Unit.

Storylines

2001 
In 2001 Smith leaves Sun Hill because he feels that the many new rules Superintendent Tom Chandler is introducing prevents him from enforcing the law. When Sergeant Bob Cryer, who had also served with the Fusiliers, encourages him to pursue his ambition to become an armed police officer and gives him the highest possible grading, Smith submitted his SO19 application.

Meanwhile, Smith and PC Nick Klein are frequently called out to the home of Frank Kennedy, an elderly man whose house is continually being vandalized by youths. Kennedy accuses the police of doing nothing about it and threatens to tackle the youths himself. To Nick’s surprise, Smith shows sympathy towards Kennedy, as he suspects property developers are paying youths to harass residents that were refusing to move, like Kennedy.

On one such call-out, Smith and Klein discover that Kennedy has shot and killed a young intruder. Klein's report to Chandler leads to an allegation that Smith encouraged Kennedy to take the law into his own hands. Believing he had lost his chance to get into SO19, Smith assaults Nick, accusing him of being a grass and showing no loyalty. Consequently, Smith is suspended from duty.

While the Kennedy shooting is under investigation, Smith, although suspended, goes under cover and, with the support of Bob Cryer, manages to expose the conspiracy between the developers and the youths. Cryer researches Kennedy’s past and discovers that he has a criminal record for dealing in firearms. This is enough for Cryer to persuade Kennedy’s lawyer to drop the allegation against Smith. Upon Smith’s return to duty after being cleared, Chandler approves his application to join SO19.

On Smith’s first day with SO19 after completing his training, a man called Chris Finnessey, who had been refused access to his son, takes Cryer and school teacher Rachel Bonington hostage and demands to see his son. In an attempt to avoid fatalities, Chandler hands the boy over to his father in exchange for Bonington. When Finnessey tries to escape in a getaway car with his son and a handcuffed Cryer, he is attacked by his enraged wife in an attempt to retrieve her son. Smith opens fire on Finnessey when he sees him trying to stab his wife, but at the same time Cryer jumps in the way, trying to separate Finnessey and his wife, and Smith's shot hits Cryer. As a result of his injury, Cryer is forced to retire on grounds of ill health, but bears no malice for Smith, and encourages his other colleagues to take the same view. Smith's superiors agree that Cryer's shooting was not a result of any incompetence, and Smith is allowed to continue his work with SO19.

2003 - 2010 
Two years later, in 2003, Smith returns to Sun Hill as the new sergeant after the death of Sergeant Matthew Boyden, who served at the station from 1991 until 2003.  He forms a very close friendship and working relationship with Inspector Gina Gold, but after he is accused of homophobia and racism he joins PC Gabriel Kent's 'SWAMP' (Straight White Male Police Association). However, he shows a more sensitive side when he is the one to learn that DC Mickey Webb has been raped by Martin Delaney.

On Smith's first day as sergeant, he kisses PC Kerry Young. They agree to go out for a drink, but he later backs out, saying that a romantic relationship between a Sergeant and a PC would not work. While observing a gang of teenage joyriders, Young seduces Smith in the car and they are caught half naked on the back seat. Thereafter Smith states that their relationship should remain strictly professional.

Young begins a relationship with PC Cameron Tait, of which Smith grows increasingly jealous.  After an argument during a drinking session, Young and Smith have a one-night stand.  Seizing the opportunity to make trouble, Gabriel Kent manipulates Young into thinking that Smith had raped her, and presses her to make an official allegation. She decides against it, but Kent spreads word around the station. Andrea Dunbar leaks the rumour to the press, and the station is divided. Even when Young realizes that Smith was incapable of rape and drops the allegation, his reputation is severely tainted.

Young discovers that Kent is working in the police under a false identity and that Dunbar is an undercover journalist. Planning to reveal all she knows before resigning from the Police Force, Young declares her love for Smith. Moments later, however, determined to stop Young from exposing him, Kent shoot her from the rooftop with a sniper rifle. She dies with Smith at her side shortly after arriving at the hospital.

While investigating a car theft, Smith meets Louise Larson, wife of gangster Pete Larson.  He is frustrated by her unhelpfulness, but also attracted to her, and they embark on an affair. When Pete Larson finds out, Smith is abducted at gunpoint, beaten up, bound, gagged and driven in the boot of a car to an empty warehouse. Larson attempts to shoot him there, but the Specialist Firearms Command arrive in time to rescue him.  Louise refuses to testify against her husband and breaks off her relationship with Smith. She changes her mind about testifying several months later, but this means she will have to go into witness protection, and she asks Smith to move to Australia with her. Before he can decide, she is killed in a hit and run incident, for which Larson tries to frame Smith. Smith is suspended from duty and charged with Louise's murder after being identified as the driver of the vehicle by a witness named Caplin.

While in custody Smith tries to help his cellmate who was wrongly accused of drug dealing inside the prison. Meanwhile, Smith's colleagues at Sun Hill try to prove his innocence. As a result of their work, Caplin finally admits to lying in an attempt to solve his debt problems, as Larson had given him a loan in exchange for accusing Smith. Larson is arrested at Louise's funeral and Smith later returns to his job at Sun Hill.

Smith has a brief affair with DC Kezia Walker. When Kezia's lease expires and she was about to be made homeless, Smith offers her a room to rent. However, they soon drift apart, and eventually split up amicably.

Smith is temporarily promoted to acting inspector when Inspector Gold takes a few weeks' leave. On his first day in the job, there is an armed robbery, an escaped convict on the loose, and the funeral of a supermodel, which requires high-visibility police presence. In addition, PC Beth Green is taken hostage and has a complaint made against her.

When Callum Stone arrives for his first day as sergeant, a criminal fends off the officers holding him for processing and tries to escape. Stone arrives at the right moment and fights the criminal to the ground. When Smith emerges from his office, he sees the two men fighting. He restrains Stone with a headlock, only realising that Stone was a police officer when he displays his warrant card to Smith.

When Gold returns, Smith is relieved of his additional duties and returns to the rank of sergeant.

Smith meets sixteen-year-old Carly Samuels when she witnesses a crime on the Jasmine Allen Estate. At a party that becomes rowdy, Smith recognises her as she was leaving, and stops her for more information.  He is horrified when she us murdered in a drive-by shooting.

The police recover the car used in the murder and find bullet casings that do not match the bullet that killed her, meaning at least two guns were used in the attack. Detective Inspector Neil Manson suspects that Samuels had gotten in the way of a revenge attack on her boyfriend Marlon Reed, by a man he attacked, Tito Morientes.  Manson has the local canal searched, and a 9mm automatic pistol is recovered.

On the way to the murder trial, Smith's car is deliberately run off the road, causing it to flip over.  When he eventually reaches the trial, he is accused of having an unprofessional relationship with the Samuels family. One of the accused, Carly's ex Dwayne Fox, changes his plea to guilty midway through the trial, with the other suspect, Tito, calling him a grass.

Smith once again comes across Carly's mother Leanne a year later during the investigation to an assault.

Smith goes under cover as a gun runner called Lawrence Smith in order to expose a gun smuggling operation. DC Stevie Moss also goes under cover, posing as Lawrence's girlfriend and providing information to DS Max Carter. The operation ends with Smith shooting Kieran Wallace, a dangerous criminal who becomes a major risk to the public when he exposes himself as an undercover police officer.

While investigating an arson attack on a school, Smith and PC Nate Roberts rescue a girl who was beaten up by two boys in the local park. When the thugs run off in different directions, the officers split up and chase after them. Smith is stabbed, causing his lung to be punctured and collapse, and he loses four pints of blood. He recovers from his injuries and, after a short break, returns to work. The two men are later arrested.

While Smith and Callum Stone are investigating a series of crimes in the Sun Hill area, Jason Devlin and his father Matthew come to their attention. They suspect the Devlins of an assault, but cannot gather sufficient evidence to arrest them. When the CID investigates an illegal immigrant trafficking scheme which had resulted in death, DCI Jack Meadows and DI Neil Manson suspect the Devlins are controlling it. When Jason Devlin "discovers" these illegal immigrants in his flats, he kicks them out, causing a riot. During this riot, DC Stevie Moss escorts Jason back to his car, where he attacks her after she tries to examine a bag in the boot. Witnessing this, Smith becomes enraged, and he in turn beats up Devlin. Stone arrives moments later to find Moss and Devlin unconscious and Smith staring at Devlin in despair. Stone persuades him to keep quiet about the incident, on the grounds that Devlin deserved what he got and Smith is too good a policeman to lose, but Devlin makes a complaint of assault against Smith, which is corroborated by a witness. However, Smith's colleagues find enough evidence to arrest Matthew Devlin for kidnapping a young girl in order to intimidate another witness against Jason, who faces other charges. After the key witness for Sun Hill arrives at court to give evidence, even after intimidation by the Devlins, Jason changes his plea to guilty.

During the Devlin investigation, Superintendent John Heaton announces that he is leaving Sun Hill and asks Rachel Weston, DS Stuart Turner and Kezia Walker to join him. Jack Meadows, the newly appointed Superintendent, asks Smith to be the new Inspector.

The first major incident Smith deals with after his promotion is a brawl outside a nightclub. An allegation of assault during this brawl causes Callum Stone to be suspended. Smith's fellow officers feel that he and Sergeant Jo Masters are failing to support Stone, and both start to lose the respect of their teams. Respect is regained when Nate Roberts overhears Masters defending the team during an argument with Max Carter. Later, when PC Mel Ryder rescues a young boy from drowning in a flooded drain, she herself becomes trapped, putting her life in jeopardy. Smith, however, enters the drain and rescues Ryder.

Reception
For his portrayal of Dale Smith, Walkinshaw received a nomination for Outstanding Drama Performance at the 14th National Television Awards in 2008.

References

External links
Inspector Dale Smith at The Bill Biographies
The Bill Bios

Fictional police sergeants
Television characters introduced in 1999
Fictional British police officers
The Bill